The Norfolk Elks were a Nebraska State League (1928–1938), Tri-State League (1924) and Western League baseball team based in Norfolk, Nebraska, United States. They were affiliated with the St. Louis Cardinals (1936) and New York Yankees (1937–1939).

They won two league championships - their first in 1935 under manager Lester Patterson and their second in 1938 under manager Doc Bennett.

References

Baseball teams established in 1924
Defunct baseball teams in Nebraska
Defunct minor league baseball teams
New York Yankees minor league affiliates
1924 establishments in Nebraska
1939 disestablishments in Nebraska
Baseball teams disestablished in 1939
St. Louis Cardinals minor league affiliates
Norfolk, Nebraska
Defunct Western League teams
Nebraska State League teams